Gymkhana Football Club is a semi-professional Singaporean football club founded in 2002 and is affiliated to the FAS. The club have currently won the National Football League Division 2, a third tier of the Singapore football league system.

Football Association of Singapore National Football League 2017
Gymkhana FC ended their season at FAS National Football League Division 2 as of 2017 where they won the title.

Singapore National Football League 2017 Division 2 Winning squad

Honours
FAS National Football League
Division 2 Champion: 2017

References
https://web.archive.org/web/20170427100228/http://www.fas.org.sg/fas/fas-affiliates-2017 
https://www.pressreader.com/singapore/today/20170420/281535110867381

https://eresources.nlb.gov.sg/newspapers/Digitised/Article/straitstimes19610418-1.2.119?ST=1&AT=search&k=jollilad%20arsenal%20fc&QT=jollilad,arsenal,fc&oref=article

Football clubs in Singapore
Association football clubs established in 2002
2002 establishments in Singapore